Ronald R. Donatucci (January 21, 1948 – November 4, 2020) was a former Democratic member of the Pennsylvania House of Representatives.

He later served as Philadelphia Register of Wills.

References

Democratic Party members of the Pennsylvania House of Representatives
Politicians from Philadelphia
Pennsylvania local politicians
Living people
1948 births